Burleigh is an unincorporated community and census-designated place (CDP) located within Middle Township in Cape May County, New Jersey, United States; Until the 2000 Census the area had been part of the Whitesboro-Burleigh CDP, which was split in 2010 into separate CDPs for Burleigh and Whitesboro. As of the 2010 United States Census, the CDP's population was 725.

Geography
According to the United States Census Bureau, the CDP had a total area of 1.550 square miles (4.015 km2), including 1.518 square miles (3.932 km2) of land and 0.032 square miles (0.083 km2) of water (2.07%).

Demographics

Census 2010

Education
It is within the Middle Township School District which operates Middle Township High School.

Countywide schools include Cape May County Technical High School and Cape May County Special Services School District.

In 1993 Richard Degener of The Press of Atlantic City described what is now the location of the private K-12 school Cape Christian Academy as being in Burleigh. The school is currently in the Cape May Courthouse CDP and not the Burleigh CDP.

References

External links
 The Cape May County Gazette, community newspaper
 The Beachcomber

Census-designated places in Cape May County, New Jersey
Middle Township, New Jersey